Trochoideus is a genus of handsome fungus beetles in the family Endomychidae. There are about 10 described species in Trochoideus.

Species
These 10 species belong to the genus Trochoideus:
 Trochoideus americanus Buquet, 1840 i c g
 Trochoideus boliviensis Strohecker, 1978 i c g
 Trochoideus coeloantennatus Strohecker, 1943 i c g
 Trochoideus desjardinsi Guérin-Méneville, 1857 i c g b
 Trochoideus globulicornis Joly and Bordon, 1996 i c g
 Trochoideus goudoti Guérin-Méneville, 1857 i c g
 Trochoideus masoni Strohecker, 1978 i c g
 Trochoideus mexicanus Strohecker, 1978 i c g
 Trochoideus peruvianus Kirsch, 1876 i c g
 Trochoideus venezuelensis Joly and Bordon, 1996 i c g
Data sources: i = ITIS, c = Catalogue of Life, g = GBIF, b = Bugguide.net

References

Further reading

External links

 

Endomychidae
Coccinelloidea genera